Mitsubishi Electric Trane HVAC US (METUS) is a company jointly owned by Trane Technologies and Mitsubishi Electric. 

An agreement between Ingersoll Rand and Mitsubishi Electric regarding establishment of the joint venture was reached in January 2018 and the company started operation in mid-2018. 

METUS markets, sells and distributes heating and air-conditioning systems in the United States and Latin America.

References

External links
MET HVAC Website
HVAC System Comparison

Trane Technologies
Mitsubishi Electric subsidiaries
Companies based in Gwinnett County, Georgia